Gobeyr-e Zahir (also Romanized as Gobeyr-e Zahīr; also known as Gobairé Zahiyeh, Goberḩīyeh, Gobeyr, and Gobeyr-e Zahīyeh) is a village in Jahad Rural District, Hamidiyeh District, Ahvaz County, Khuzestan Province, Iran. At the 2006 census, its population was 490, in 73 families.

References 

Populated places in Ahvaz County